Crockeria is a genus of spiders in the family Thomisidae. It was first described in 2016 by Benjamin. , it contains 2 species.

References

Thomisidae
Araneomorphae genera
Spiders of Asia